The Mayfair Hotel is a historic building at Spring and Center Streets in Searcy, Arkansas.  It is an L-shaped two story brick building, with Spanish Revival styling.  It has a hip roof with stepped wall dormers and exposed rafter ends in the eaves, and a corner tower with a similar stepped parapet.  Built in 1924, it is the only historically non-residential Spanish Revival building in White County.  It has been converted into a multiunit apartment house.

The building was listed on the National Register of Historic Places in 1991.

See also
National Register of Historic Places listings in White County, Arkansas

References

Hotel buildings on the National Register of Historic Places in Arkansas
Mission Revival architecture in Arkansas
National Register of Historic Places in Searcy, Arkansas
Apartment buildings on the National Register of Historic Places in Arkansas
1924 establishments in Arkansas
Hotel buildings completed in 1924